True Evil may refer to:
 The 2006 novel by Greg Iles
 Character Alignment (role-playing games)
 The embodied form of the devil, harming the world around him.